A by-election was held in the federal riding of York—Simcoe in Ontario on February 25, 2019, following the resignation of incumbent Conservative MP Peter Van Loan. After 15 years in Parliament, the former Leader of the Official Opposition announced that he would resign his seat. The by-election occurred alongside two others; Outremont and Burnaby South.

The seat was held for the Conservatives by Scot Davidson.

Background

Constituency 
York—Simcoe is a rural constituency based in the York Region and Simcoe County, just to the north of the Greater Toronto Area. York—Simcoe has been considered a safe seat for the Conservatives, but at the 2015 election the Liberal Party saw a huge increase in share of vote; 26 percentage points.

Representation 
Peter Van Loan announced on July 29, 2018, that he would be resigning as MP for York—Simcoe effective September 30, 2018. Van Loan has held the seat since the riding's creation in 2004.

Campaign 
Scot Davidson, Heather Fullerton, and Jason Verkaik sought the Conservative nomination. In a nomination meeting on October 20, Scot Davidson was declared the Conservative candidate.

Shaun Tanaka, a local professor and the riding's 2015 Liberal candidate, won the Liberal nomination.

In a nomination meeting on December 6, Jessa McLean was acclaimed as the NDP candidate.

The People's Party announced Robert Geurts as their candidate.

Sébastien Corriveau, leader of the Rhinoceros Party, stated his intention to run in this by-election, but he did not register.

The candidate of the Libertarian Party was Keith Komar.

The Speaker's warrant regarding the vacancy was received on October 1, 2018; under the Parliament of Canada Act the writ for a by-election had to be dropped no later than March 30, 2019, 180 days after the Chief Electoral Officer was officially notified of the vacancy via a warrant issued by the Speaker. The by-election was called on January 9, 2019, to be held on February 25, 2019.

Results

2015 result

References 

2019 elections in Canada
2019 in Ontario
Federal by-elections in Ontario